Felipe Folgosi (born Luis Felipe de Andrade Folgosi on May 18, 1974 in São Paulo) is a Brazilian actor, television presenter and comics writer, best known for his roles in telenovelas. In 2012, he was the runner-up of the fifth season of the Brazilian version of The Farm.

Career

Filmography

References

External links 

1974 births
Brazilian male television actors
Brazilian male telenovela actors
Brazilian television presenters
Brazilian comics writers

Living people
The Farm (TV series) contestants